Jesza (read as Yesha;) or Jasza (read as Yasha;) is an alleged Polish god. He was first mentioned around 1405-1412 in the sermons of Lucas of Wielki Koźmin, which warned against worshipping Jesza and other gods during spring rituals and folk performances. He owes his popularity to Jan Długosz's comparison of him to the Roman god Jupiter. Contemporary researchers mostly reject the authenticity of the deity.

Latin names should be read as Polish Jesza or Jasza. In the 15th century, the Polish voiceless retroflex fricative (sh sound) was written as ss (modern Polish sz).

Sources 

The first known source mentioning the name Jesza is the Pentacostal Sermons, which were written by Lucas of Wielki Koźmin around 1405-1412, without giving any specific description:

Similar warnings, also without any description, are also found in: Statua provincialia breviter (1420-1422), Sermones per circulum anni Cunradi (1423), Postilla Husitae anonymi, and in glosses of Life of Adalbert of Prague.

The theonyms contained in the Pentacostal Sermons were also repeated by Jan Długosz, who made an interpretatio romana and compared Jesza to the Roman chief god Jupiter:

After Długosz the information about Jesza was repeated by Maciej Miechowita, Marcin Kromer, Alexander Guagnini, Maciej Stryjkowski, Marcin and Joachim Bielski, and the priest Jakub Wujek.

Historicity 

Originally, the historicity of Jesza was not questioned; he appears in the works of Polish Romantics, such as Bronislaw Trentowski. This situation changed when Aleksander Brückner criticised the sources mentioning Jesza. Brückner pointed out that the word ješa (yesha) in Old Church Slavonic meant "may", and he also hypothesized that it could not have been the name of the old god as, in his opinion, it was accidentally heard in folk songs. Although this position was not fully embraced by other scholars such as Karol Potkański, it was subsequently supported by such scholars as Henryk Łowmiański, or Stanisław Urbańczyk though none of these were aware of the Lucas of Wielki Koźmin postilla.

Contemporary scholars often criticize Brückner's views on the information given by Długosz, regarding them as hypercritical. However, many scholars, such as Aleksander Gieysztor, or Vyacheslav Ivanov and Vladimir Toporov, who consider at least part of Długosz's mythological account valuable also reject the historicity of Jesza, and believe the deity was created through a misunderstanding of the refrains of folk songs or words, as suggested by Brückner, or ignore him in their publications as does Andrzej Szyjewski,. According to Brückner, Długosz considered Jesza to be equivalent to Jupiter because of the phonetic similarity ( "Jupiter", from Latin Jovis).

Other modern scholars, such as the historian Włodzimierz Szafrański, the cultural anthropologist Leszek Kolankiewicz  and the historian and medievalist Krzysztof Bracha  appear more willing to accept the authenticity of the theonym.

Origin 
The word ješa occurs in Old Church Slavonic (ѥша, ⰵⱎⰰ) as a wishful participle "I wish that, utinam". As an example, a passage from the Old Church Slavonic translation of the Bible ješa i nie sьbrali sьbora is given, which is translated as "would indeed they had not convened the council!". According to linguists, originally the word ješa meant "may be" and was third-person singular optative of the word *jesmь ("I am") – so easily the original meaning of "may be" could have shifted into "if only". Consequently, there is a consensus among scholars that the word jesza appearing in the church texts occurs in this sense and was mistakenly considered a deity. However, etymological dictionaries state that the word ješa is attested only in Old Church Slavonic (and its Russian and Serbian versions), and no researcher has indicated where this word found its way into Polish chants.

Another explanation is proposed by Michał Łuczyński, who points to Maria Malec's work Imiona chrześcijańskie w średniowiecznej Polsce. According to Malec, the suffix -sz forms 56 derivations from Christian names, 15 times with Christian names ending in a consonant and 40 times with Christian names ending in a vowel, and she points to the names Busz, Dasz, Desz, Dosz, Gasz, Niesz, Siesz and others. She also lists the name Jasz – Jesz, as two phonetic variants of one name: Jasz as a Lesser Poland name from 1228, and Jesz as a Mazovian name from 1429, and their variants: Jaszak, Jaszek, Jaszko, Jeszek, Jeszko, Jeszel. Also attested is the hypocoristic (diminutive) of the name with the suffix -a: Jasza from 1408. These names are an abbreviation of the name Jan, Polish equivalent of John, so the name Jesza should be considered as its derivative.

Interpretations 
Despite strong criticism of the source material mentioning Jesza, some scholars have accepted or are accepting its historicity and have made interpretations of this theonym.

According to Włodzimierz Szafrański, Jesza could have been a Pan-Slavic or even Pan-Indo-European god. He believed that the name of the god, Jesza, was clearly etymologically related to another Indo-European god, the Celtic Esus, whose name was derived, as in the case of the Norse Æsir (in Old Norse áss, óss meant "god"), from the same Indo-European root *ansu- ("lord, ruler, god"). Also derived from this stem is the Avestan word ahura meaning "lord", and which later became the epithet of the Zarathushtrian god Ahura Mazda as "Lord of Wisdom", to whom the yasna ritual is dedicated, the Sanskrit word ásura "divine, powerful", or the Hittite ḫaššuš "king". In Georges Dumézil's trifunctional hypothesis Esus is compared to Jupiter and Odin, and this should support Długosz' comparison of Jesza to Jupiter. In the case of the second form of the deity's name, Jasza, Szafrański believed that an additional influence on its formation could have been exerted by the Sarmatian/Alanian tribe of Jasz living in part of today's Poland.

According to Leszek Kolankiewicz, Jesza was the Polish equivalent of Dazhbog (or Svarog assuming that Dazhbog is the local equivalent of Svarog) stating that the names of both gods actually mean the same. He points to another wish-particle, bodaj, and quotes a 15th-century wish Bogdaj mu zaległ usta wrzód literally meaning "Lord/God, let him have an ulcer in his mouth" with a clear structure daj Boże "please God", and this brings to mind associations with Dazhbog, whose name is translated in two ways: either as daj-bog "God who gives", or as dag-bog, where the first part comes from the Proto-Indo-European stem *dag meaning "to burn", i.e. "God who burns". Thus Jesza, like Dazhbog, would have been the god of sun and fire, the giving, punishing and burning god. He concludes at the same time that since Lada is always mentioned first in the sources, she (or he) may have been the most important god.

Jesza in culture 
Manuscript by Bronislaw Trentowski: With the word Halu Jessa created the world and all that existed in it. Therefore Triglav, having heard it, tore off his three heads, and from the blood that flowed from them arose hosts of three successive deities.

References

Bibliography 
 

 
 
 
 
 
 
 
 
 
 
 
 
 
 

Slavic pseudo-deities